The IMRO Live Music Venue of the Year Awards are annual awards which are presented by the Irish Music Rights Organisation (IMRO) in conjunction with Hot Press and MUZU TV. The awards were first given in 2008.

Format
IMRO's members select their three favourite music venues in Ireland. 400 venues are said to be eligible for the awards and included are theatres and public houses. The winning venues are then shortlisted for the IMRO Live Music Venue of the Year Awards. The Hot Press Readers Award for Best Live Music Venue is voted on by the public on the magazine's website. Several factors determine the winners: these include "ambience, staging, sound and lighting, programming, staff and promotion".:

History

2008
The winning venues were announced during The Music Show at the RDS in Dublin.

Shortlist
The nominations by region with the winners in bold:

Hot Press awards went to Cyprus Avenue, Cork, The Stables, Mullingar and Vicar Street, Dublin. Vicar Street received an award for Overall National Winner.

2009
The 2009 IMRO Live Music Venue of the Year Awards were launched by Danny O'Reilly of The Coronas and Julie Feeney on 21 October. The awards ceremony occurred on 1 December, at IMRO HQ in Dublin.

Shortlist
The nominations by region with the winners in bold:

The Hot Press award went to Cyprus Avenue in Cork.

2010
The 2010 IMRO Live Music Venue of the Year Awards were launched on 3 October.

References

2000s in Irish music
2010s in Irish music
Awards established in 2008
Irish music awards